David Hopkin "Glyn" Stephens (19 September 1891 – 22 April 1965) was a Welsh international rugby union prop who played club rugby for Neath. He won 10 caps for Wales and captained his country. He was the father of Welsh rugby international, Rees Stephens and would later become president of the Welsh Rugby Union.

Rugby career
Stephens earned his first Welsh cap against England on 20 January 1912 in a game at Twickenham, Wales lost the game, but Stephens was back for the next three matches in the 1912 Five Nations Championship. Stephens played not only in the home nations matches but also faced South Africa in the 1912 tour. After the war he played his last international game when he captained the Welsh team against the New Zealand Army. After his retirement from the game he became involved in the management of rugby and in 1956 became president of the WRU.

International matches played
Wales
  1912, 1913
  1912, 1913
  1912, 1913
 New Zealand Army XV 1919
  1912, 1913
  1912

Bibliography

References

1891 births
1965 deaths
Neath RFC players
Rugby union players from Neath
Rugby union props
Wales international rugby union players
Wales rugby union captains
Wales Rugby Union officials
Welsh rugby union players